Janeček (feminine Janečková) is a Czech surname. Notable people with the surname include:

 Blažena Janečková, Czech chess master
 Clarence Janecek (1911-1990), American football player
 Dieter Janecek, German politician
 František Janeček (1878-1941), Czech engineer
 Ivana Janečková, Czech cross-country skier
 Karel Janeček (born 1973), Czech mathematician and entrepreneur
 Patricia Janečková, Slovak opera singer
 Pavel Janeček, Czech swimmer
 Václav Janeček, Czech sprinter

See also
John Janecek House

Czech-language surnames
Patronymic surnames
Surnames from given names